Event is a  superyacht launched by Amels Holland B.V. at their yard in Vlissingen. She was designed by Tim Heywood, and the interior design was by Laura Sessa of Nuvolari Lenard, who also christened the yacht. She has two sister ships, the 2018 built Sea & Us and the 2015 built Madame Kate.

Design 
The hull is built out of steel while the superstructure is made out of aluminium with teak laid decks. The yacht is Lloyd's registered, issued by Cayman Islands.

Some of the yacht's features include an enclosed lounge on the sun deck, a helicopter platform on the foredeck, and two folding balconies, and a beach club with a swim platform, retractable stairs, a sauna, steam shower and gym equipment.

Propulsion 
She is powered by twin Caterpillar 3512C engines.

See also
 List of motor yachts by length
 List of yachts built by Amels BV

References

2013 ships
Motor yachts
Ships built in the Netherlands